Lu Jinqing (born 5 December 1962) is a Chinese former basketball player who competed in the 1984 Summer Olympics.

References

1962 births
Living people
Basketball players from Guangdong
Chinese men's basketball players
1982 FIBA World Championship players
Olympic basketball players of China
Basketball players at the 1984 Summer Olympics
Asian Games medalists in basketball
Basketball players at the 1982 Asian Games
Asian Games silver medalists for China
Medalists at the 1982 Asian Games